Pismira is a genus of flies belonging to the family Lesser Dung flies.

Species
P. citrago Richards, 1960
P. kabare Richards, 1960
P. mwenga Richards, 1960
P. uvira Richards, 1960

References

Sphaeroceridae
Diptera of Africa
Sphaeroceroidea genera